Specials was a 1991 BBC Birmingham series about Special Constables in a fictional Midlands town.

Twelve 50- minute episodes were made.

The series was shot on videotape at Pebble Mill, Birmingham and using locations around West Bromwich and Birmingham, England.

Cast
Brian Gwaspari as Section Officer John Redwood
Martin Cochrane as Special Constable Bob Loach
Ron Donachie as Special Constable Freddy Calder
Cindy O'Callaghan as Special Constable Viv Smith
Kim Vithana as Special Constable Anjail Shah
Lockwood West as George Adams

External links
 

1990s British crime television series
BBC television dramas
1991 British television series debuts
1991 British television series endings
1990s British drama television series
1990s British television miniseries
BBC Birmingham productions
English-language television shows
Television shows set in Birmingham, West Midlands